Nassim Othmane Zoukit (born 30 April 2001) is a Swiss professional footballer who plays as a defender for Swiss Super League club Lausanne-Sport.

Personal life 
Born in Switzerland, Zoukit is of Moroccan descent. He holds both Moroccan and Swiss nationality.

References 

2001 births
Living people
Swiss men's footballers
Moroccan footballers
Swiss people of Moroccan descent
Citizens of Morocco through descent

Association football defenders
CD Lugo players
Girona FC players
Étoile Carouge FC players
FC Lausanne-Sport players
Swiss Promotion League players
Swiss Super League players
Swiss expatriate footballers
Moroccan expatriate footballers
Expatriate footballers in Spain
Swiss expatriate sportspeople in Spain
Moroccan expatriate sportspeople in Spain